Eilema pulvereola is a moth of the subfamily Arctiinae first described by George Hampson in 1900. It is found on Borneo. The habitat consists of lowland forests of all types, including heath forests.

References

pulvereola